Lewis White may refer to:

 Lewis White (footballer) (1927–1982), English footballer
 Lewis White (swimmer) (born 2000), Paralympic British swimmer